Nicholas Rutherford (born August 7, 1985) is an American actor, comedian, writer, and co-founder of the sketch comedy group Good Neighbor. He has performed live stand up and sketch comedy in Los Angeles and New York. He was a writer for Saturday Night Live.

Early life
Rutherford is originally from Thousand Oaks, California. He attended college at the University of Southern California. There, he performed improv and sketch comedy with collegiate group, Commedus Interruptus. He was hired to write for SNL until he was abruptly fired after only one season.

Career

Good Neighbor
In 2007, Rutherford came together with Kyle Mooney, Beck Bennett, and Dave McCary to form the sketch comedy group Good Neighbor. Some of their videos include "My Mom's a MILF", "Is My Roommate Gay?", "Outrageous Fun", "420 Disaster", "This is How We Trip", "Toast", and "Unbelievable Dinner", a sketch based on the movie Hook.

Talking Marriage with Ryan Bailey
On April 30, 2014, Nick was a guest on Ryan Bailey's webseries Talking Marriage with Ryan Bailey.

Rutherford works for Fox as a voice actor and writer for the animated series Golan the Insatiable, for which he wrote the fourth episode in the 2015 season, "Shell Raiser".

Dream Corp, LLC 
Nick stars as "Patient 88" on the Adult Swim series Dream Corp, LLC.

References

External links
 
 Nick Rutherford's Twitter
 Nick Rutherford's YouTube Channel
 Good Neighbor YouTube Channel

1982 births
American male actors
American male television actors
American male voice actors
American male comedians
American male writers
People from Thousand Oaks, California
Primetime Emmy Award winners
Living people
Comedians from California
21st-century American comedians